On November 6, 2018, El Paso County elected a new member of the House of Representatives of the United States, a new county judge, two county commissioners, five state representatives, four city council members.

The national, state and county elections are partisan, and the city council election is non-partisan (there is no primary election for the city, but if no candidate wins a majority there will be a run-off election). The city and county officials elected will serve four year terms, and the state representatives and Congressperson will serve two year terms.

There are several open races, as the incumbent member of Congress, Beto O'Rourke, a Democrat, unsuccessfully ran for the Senate against Ted Cruz, and the incumbent county judge, Veronica Escobar, ran successfully for O'rourke's seat in the House of Representatives. Incumbent county commissioners David Stout (Precinct 2), a Democrat, and Andrew Haggerty (Precinct 4), a Republican, ran for re-election. Stout was re-elected, and Haggerty was defeated by former city council member Carl Robinson. The five state representatives (all Democrats), Cesar Blanco, Mary Gonzalez, Joe Moody, Lina Ortega and Joe Pickett, were re-elected.

City council districts 1, 5, 6, and 8 had elections in 2018. Michiel Noe, District 5 incumbent, is term limited and could not run again. District 1 incumbent, Peter Svarzbein, District 6 incumbent, Claudia Ordaz, and Cissy Lizarraga, District 8 incumbent, were re-elected.

County Judge election

Democratic Party

Candidates
 John Cook, former mayor of El Paso (2005–2013)
 Laura Enriquez, personal injury lawyer
 Ricardo Samaniego, business owner, University of Phoenix instructor, and former juvenile probation officer

Declined candidates
 Veronica Escobar, former county judge (2011–2017)
 Andrew Haggerty, county commissioner
 Vince Perez, county commissioner

Republican Party

Candidates

Democratic Party primary results

Republican Party primary results

General election results

County Commissioner, precinct 2 election

Democratic Party

Nominee
 Incumbent county commissioner David Stout

Primary candidates
 Former county commissioner Sergio Lewis

Republican Party

Candidates

Democratic Party primary results

Republican Party primary results

General election results

County Commissioner, precinct 4 election

Republican Party

Nominee
 Incumbent county commissioner Andrew Haggerty

Democratic Party

Nominee
 Former city council member Carl Robinson

Democratic Party primary results

Republican Party primary results

General election results

City council election

District 1

Candidates
 Richard Bonart, dentist
 Carlos Corral, filmmaker
 Veronica Frescas, non-profit employee
 Peter Svarzbein, incumbent

First round results

District 5

Candidates
 Kizito Ezechukwu, auditor
 John Hogan, self-employed
 Benjamin Miranda
 Jason Osborne, security consultant
 Isabel Salcido, self-employed

Results

District 6

Candidates
 Claudia Ordaz, incumbent
 George Stoltzt

Results

District 8

Candidates
 Gregory Baine, U.S. Army veteran
 Dylan Corbett, non-profit executive
 Cissy Lizarraga, incumbent
 Nicholas Vasquez
 Rich Wright, blogger

Results

State representative, District 75 election

Democratic Party

Candidates
 MarySue Femath, family counselor at the Ysleta Del Sur Pueblo reservation
 Mary Gonzalez, incumbent representative

Republican Party

Candidates

Democratic Party primary results

Republican Party primary results

General election results

State representative, District 76 election

Candidates
Incumbent state representative Cesar Blanco

Potential candidates

Declined candidates

Democratic Party primary results

Republican Party primary results

General election results

State representative, District 77 election

Potential candidates

Declined candidates

Democratic Party primary results

Republican Party primary results

General election results

State representative, District 78 election

Potential candidates

Declined candidates

Democratic Party primary results

Republican Party primary results

General election results

State representative, District 79 election

Potential candidates

Declined candidates

Democratic Party primary results

Republican Party primary results

General election results

Member of Congress, 16th Congressional district of Texas election

Democratic Party

Nominee
 Veronica Escobar, former El Paso County Judge

Primary candidates
 John Carillo, director of development at KTEP (88.5 FM)
 Norma Chavez, former state representative
 Dori Fenenbock, former EPISD school board president
 Enrique Garcia, immigration lawyer
 Nicole LeClaire, Navy veteran and Cypress Creek high school teacher
 Jerome Tilghman, Army veteran and Canyon Hills Middle School teacher

Declined candidates
 Incumbent congressman Beto O'Rourke
 State representative Cesar Blanco

Republican Party

Nominee
Rick Seeberger

Primary candidates
Alia Garcia-Ureste, businesswoman

Independent

Potential candidates
Jessica Kludt Allala, lawyer

Democratic Party primary results

Republican Party primary results

General election results

References

El Paso, Texas
El Paso
Elections 2018